Nature Catalysis is a monthly peer-reviewed scientific journal published by Nature Research. It was established in 2018. The editor-in-chief is Davide Esposito.

Abstracting and indexing 
The journal is abstracted and indexed in:
Compendex
Science Citation Index Expanded
Scopus

According to the Journal Citation Reports, the journal has a 2021 impact factor of 40.706, ranking it 3rd out of 163 journals in the category "Chemistry, Physical".

References

External links 
 

Monthly journals
Publications established in 2018
Nature Research academic journals
Chemistry journals
Online-only journals
English-language journals